Bryn Jones may refer to:
Bryn Jones (footballer, born 1912) (1912–1985), Welsh footballer
Bryn Jones (footballer, born 1931) (1931–1990), Welsh footballer
Bryn Jones (footballer, born 1938), English professional footballer
Bryn Jones (footballer, born 1939), Welsh footballer
Bryn Jones (footballer, born 1948), Welsh footballer
David Bryn-Jones (1883–?), Welsh-born historian, professor, Baptist minister, and biographer
Delme Bryn-Jones (1934–2001), Welsh baritone singer
Bryn Terfel (born 1965), opera singer, born as Bryn Jones
Muslimgauze (1961–1999), British electronic music artist born as Bryn Jones
Brynley Jones (born 1959), former footballer with Chester (name sometimes shortened to Bryn)
Ginger Jones (1905–1986), ring name of Welsh champion boxer Bryn Jones